Irina is a feminine given name.

Irina may also refer to:

Geography 
 Irina, a small river in Romania, tributary of the Rătășel
 Irina, Madagascar, a town and commune in Ihorombe Region, Madagascar
 Irina, a village in Andrid Commune, Satu Mare County, Romania
 Irina or Hirina, an ancient city, former bishopric and Latin Catholic titular see in present Tunisia

Other uses 
 Irina: The Vampire Cosmonaut, a Japanese novel series and its anime adaptation
 Irina, a fictional character from the video game Xenoblade Chronicles X